Thomas R. Dockrell (1924-2012) was an American ice hockey player and coach for Colgate. Dockrell spent one season as Red Raiders coach before the program was dropped after the 1950–51 season. While the program was reestablished six years later, Dockrell was not retained. Dockrell served in the Army Air Force during World War II and was a member of the US AAU Team that was disqualified from competition at the 1948 Winter Olympics.

Head coaching record

References

External links

1924 births
2012 deaths
Colgate Raiders men's ice hockey players
Colgate Raiders men's ice hockey coaches
People from Melrose, Massachusetts
Ice hockey coaches from Massachusetts
People from Stoneham, Massachusetts
American men's ice hockey left wingers
Sportspeople from Middlesex County, Massachusetts
United States Army Air Forces personnel of World War II
Ice hockey players from Massachusetts